Sedum clavatum is a succulent plant that grows in compact rosettes that elongate into long stems with time. Originally identified growing in southern Mexico, S. clavatum produces white, star-shaped flowers in mid to late spring to early summer. They are often grown as decorative plants in rock gardens. It grows 4 to 6 inches tall at mature height and 8 inches wide. S. clavatum is an annual that needs average watering and is categorized as fairly easy to maintain. It flourishes in semi-arid and arid climates from southern California to mid-Texas, but can be grown elsewhere given proper precautions.

Care
Sedum clavatum require porous, well-draining soil and 4–6 hours of sunlight. Plants should be watered when the soil is dry, but over-watering is to be avoided.

References

clavatum
Plants described in 1975